Quartet Live is a 2009 live album by American jazz vibraphonist Gary Burton. The record features a revival of Burton’s quartet format of the late 1960s and early 1970s, and the return of Burton veterans Pat Metheny on guitar and Steve Swallow on bass guitar along with young virtuoso Antonio Sanchez on drums. The album was recorded on June 10–11, 2007 at Yoshi's jazz club and released in 2009 via the Concord Jazz label.

Reception
John Fordham of The Guardian wrote "This group sounds as if it's on even more of a roll on this California live recording than it was at a thrilled Barbican last summer. A guitar/vibes dialogue might sound like a recipe for lots of notes and chamber-jazz, but this band is as hard-grooving as Gary Burton's original 1970s quartet - which also featured this group's bass guitarist, Steve Swallow, and a 19-year-old Metheny. Burton, one of the most creative figures in the first wave of jazz-rock, achieved a near-perfect balance of striking tunes, jazz fluency and country-rock conviviality - and Metheny's singing sound and blues/rock licks were the ideal foil. This group recaptures all that, with help from Metheny's fiery young drummer Antonio Sanchez."

Ken Dryden of AllMusic stated, "This reunion will hopefully lead to future recorded reunions by these four gifted musicians."

Track listing

Personnel
 Gary Burton – vibraphone
 Pat Metheny – guitar
 Steve Swallow – bass
 Antonio Sanchez – drums

References

External links

Gary Burton live albums
2009 live albums